Durants School is a coeducational Special School in Enfield, London. There are 95 pupils on the roll, between the ages of 11 and 19.

As part of a global citizenship initiative, it has a link to Dworzulu School in Accra.

An emotional awareness project, which is relatively unusual for special schools, was conducted at the school in 1996.

A unit for autistic learners was opened in 2005.

References

External links
 Official site

Enfield, London
Special schools in the London Borough of Enfield
Community schools in the London Borough of Enfield
Special secondary schools in England